Antoine Joux (born 1967) is a French cryptographer,
one of the three 2013 Gödel Prize laureates., specifically cited for his paper A one round protocol for tripartite Diffie-Hellman.

References 

1967 births
Living people
French cryptographers
Place of birth missing (living people)
International Association for Cryptologic Research fellows
Gödel Prize laureates